Hindle Glacier is a glacier  long, flowing north from the vicinity of Mount Paterson into Royal Bay on the north coast of South Georgia. It was surveyed by the South Georgia Survey (SGS), 1951–52. The name "Bruce Glacier" was used unofficially by the British South Georgia Expedition, 1954–55, but a number of Antarctic features are named for Dr. William S. Bruce. The UK Antarctic Place-Names Committee recommended in 1957 that the glacier be named for Dr. Edward Hindle, a British zoologist who, as Honorary Secretary of the Royal Geographical Society, was of great assistance to the SGS expeditions.

See also
 List of glaciers in the Antarctic
 Glaciology

References

Glaciers of South Georgia